WTCC may refer to:

 WTCC (FM), a radio station (90.7 FM) licensed to Springfield, Massachusetts, United States
 Wisconsin Technical College Conference, an athletic conference for the Wisconsin Technical College System
 World Touring Car Championship, an international motor racing championship for Touring Cars, organised by the FIA
 World Trade and Convention Centre, a convention centre in Halifax, Nova Scotia, Canada
 Colombo World Trade Center, the World Trade Center of Sri Lanka
 Wake Technical Community College a two-year college located in Raleigh, North Carolina USA
 World Team Chess Championship